Pierre Blanchy (1897 – 1981) was a French politician, who served as acting Minister of State for Monaco three times between 1944 and 1963, serving under the monarchy of both Rainier III and Louis II. He was succeeded by Jean Reymond for the final time in 1963 after dedicated service of nearly 20 years.

References

Ministers of State of Monaco
1897 births
1981 deaths